Bonepony is an American rock band, formed in the late 1980s by singer/songwriter Scott Johnson and guitarist Bryan Ward in the Baltimore, Maryland area. By all accounts, Bonepony began as a hard rock band, similar in style to Aerosmith. The band recorded a demo and toured sporadically.

Formation (1989-1990)
Scott Johnson was born Jerry Scott Johnson on October 28, 1966 in Mt. Pleasant, Texas, where he began singing in church and school choir as a child. He began writing songs at age 14 and joined his first band at age 18. Johnson eventually realized that, in order to make it in the music business, he would have to move away from Mt. Pleasant. “I felt like I had to get out of Texas," Johnson confesses on the band's Celebration Highway (2007) DVD concert film/documentary. "I couldn’t get a job to support my music habit and I had some friends that had family up here in Baltimore, so we moved up and that’s where Bonepony got started, was in Maryland.”

Choosing the Name
During a June 2002 interview with the internet-only music magazine Ear Candy, Johnson was asked, "...who came up with the band’s name? Bonepony?" Johnson replied, “Actually, Bryan did, the guy that I started the band with, Bryan Ward. We didn't know what it meant at the time and still don't!”

History

Early 1990s
In 1991, Johnson and Ward moved to Nashville, Tennessee and left their bandmates behind. In Nashville, the two met Kenny Mims, a music producer and veteran session player. The trio created a new sound for the band, mixing the acoustic power of Led Zeppelin III with similarly styled folk, bluegrass, and country influences. The three musicians spent two years writing songs that would later become their debut album Stomp Revival.

Capitol Records (1994–1997)
At the tail end of the grunge rock craze in 1994, Capitol Records signed Bonepony with the vision that the band was going to be the next new wave of music. In June 1995, Bonepony released its debut album Stomp Revival. During 1995–1996, in support of that album, the band toured the United States with some major musical acts including Bob Seger and Santana. During these touring years, the band also featured musicians Jason Dunaway on bass and Mickey Grimm, originally from Muscle Shoals, Alabama, on drums. In early 1996, Mims left the band and was replaced by former Walk The West fiddle/mandolin player, Mike "Tramp" Lawing, who brought a bluegrass vibe to the band with the addition of fiddle, banjo and mandolin. Tramp had moved to Nashville in 1984, landing gigs as fiddle player for The Kendalls and the Cactus Brothers before hooking up with Bonepony. In late 1996, Dunaway and Grimm left the band, yet Johnson, Ward and Tramp soldiered on as a trio.

Although heralded by many critics as "the future of music," Capitol Records was unsure how to market Bonepony's unique amalgam of musical styles. Therefore, the label was unmotivated to market the band and did nothing in the way of promotion. As Johnson explains, "...it was like a seven record deal with their option each time, and we were supposed to be guaranteed to make two albums, but we did Stomp Revival, and they seemed real pumped on it in the beginning but, I think they weren’t quite sure how to market the record. A lot of changes were going on in the music business then, you know, Dave Matthews hadn’t quite hit yet, Blues Traveler, they were on their fourth record which hadn’t really quite hit yet either. And it was a real backlash of all the Seattle music that was going on, a lot of guessing as to what was going to be the next hot thing." In 1997, Capitol Records rejected the group's proposed second album and dropped the band from the label. According to Scott, "I think they signed us in hopes that it was going to be a real rootsy thing but it wasn’t so much, and a lot of the blame of us not doing great I think has to be placed on us, too. But we really have only one market where we could play and make any money and that was Nashville. So here we are trying to tour on a record with all this major label support behind us, but we couldn’t draw flies in any other market. And anybody that plays in a band knows, you gotta have a crowd if you’re going to be sustained. It’s gotta be real and genuine support and not hype support; you can’t buy it. So I think Capitol was disappointed with sales on the first record and they put us in the studio to make the second one and they didn’t like the direction the music was going. I think they were going “how would I market this? I don’t hear a radio hit…” so they dropped us. We were seven songs into the second record and we got dropped, which we were all excited about at the time because it was a lot of hard work. But I'm proud of what we’ve done since then, we forged ahead and did our own thing."

1998
Johnson, Ward, and Tramp woodshedded, working on new material, and in 1998 recorded their second studio album at a small lakehouse on Center Hill Lake which they converted into their own studio. That record was Traveler's Companion.

1999
In May 1999, the band released Traveler’s Companion, on their own independent record label, SuperDuper Recordings. Traveler's Companion continued with the band's brand of self-described "power folk" music and featured a guest vocal appearance by fellow alt-country pioneer Lucinda Williams. This same month, Ward exited the fold and the band recruited multi-instrumentalist Nicolas "Nick" Nguyen to handle guitar duties. Bonepony continued touring the United States and Canada with a break-neck schedule of 200+ dates per year.

During a November 2003 interview with Sidelines, the student newspaper of Middle Tennessee State University which is Nguyen's alma mater, he was asked, "Do you guys ever regret signing with Capitol Records? Is this like the dark period of your recording career?" Nguyen answered laughing, "No, not at all. Actually, the recording deal came in before I joined the band. But they [old members Bryan Ward, Kenny Mims and vocalist Scott Johnson] got to go on tour with a lot of mainstream acts, which helped get our name out. I mean, even though the record deal tied our hands, there are no regrets. It worked out well for what it was."

2001
On November 13, 2001, the band released Funhouse, which was its first live album and third overall.

2002
Rare Cuts, a collection of Bonepony's early and rare recordings, was released during this year as the band's fourth album. Dodge's 2002 “Truckville” advertising campaign, with commercial spots airing in 11 Southeastern US states, featured the song “Mountainside” from the Traveler's Companion album. The commercials were part of an advertising campaign by Dodge to enlist lesser known regional musicians. According to Scott Johnson, the opportunity came about via a friend of the band, who loaned the band's 1999 CD Traveler's Companion to an acquaintance from Dodge's ad agency. The company put together a sample clip before it called the band in, and then it offered the same trade-off that it's been offering other groups: the licensing of music to a corporation in exchange for MTV-like text on the commercial that clearly identifies the band and the song. Dodge's ads began with the words “Bonepony, 'Mountainside,’ Traveler's Companion.”

2003
On June 3, 2003, Bonepony released its fifth studio album entitled Jubilee and toured promoting its grass-roots style. Jubilee mixed Johnson's folk and rock roots with Nguyen's polished, Beatles-esque songwriting and was well received by fans and critics alike, charting highly on the Americana music charts.

2004
For several years a Nashville-based musician named Kenny Wright had played sporadically with Bonepony, and in July 2004 he became a permanent member of the band when Tramp chose to retire from touring and take a position at the International Bluegrass Music Museum in Owensboro, Kentucky. Wright had been a long-time friend of Nguyen, and the two musicians had been in and out of bands together for 20 years. Wright supplied drums, percussion, guitar, dulcimer, mandola and mandolin. With Nguyen and Wright splitting the instrumental duties, as well as the addition of bass pedals (masterfully played by Nguyen with his feet), the sound was refined and solidified so that the entire Bonepony canon could be performed live.

2005
During the summer of 2005, Bonepony performed at the 10th Annual Master Musicians Festival in Somerset, Kentucky. Kentucky Educational Television (KET), Kentucky's statewide public television network, filmed their live performance over two nights for the KET-produced television series, Jubilee: A Celebration of American Music, featuring performances of bluegrass, blues, and other American roots music.

2006
Bonepony’s 2005 performance at the 10th Annual Master Musicians Festival originally aired on KET's Jubilee: A Celebration of American Music (Jubilee Show #1104) during 2006. The 60-minute show includes several interviews with Johnson and features performances by the band over two nights of the following songs:
 Night/Set #1 (30 minutes): "Poor Boy Blues", "Feast of Life", "Cowboy Song/Long-Haired Country Boy", "Jubilee", "Sugar on the Pill" and "Everybody Sing".
 Night/Set #2 (30 minutes): "Old Song", "Voodoo Banjo", "Where the Water's Deep", and "Mountainside".
Bonepony's KET performance continues to air periodically on that station and other public broadcasting affiliates throughout the United States.

During spring 2006, the band released its sixth studio album entitled Feeling It. In the winter of 2006, the band began making plans to record its second live album, Celebration Highway, as a CD/DVD combo.

In October 2006, Bonepony's trailer and entire road show was stolen. Everything but their stringed instruments was taken, including all of their production, P.A., Wright's priceless custom drum kit, cymbals, guitar rigs, T-shirts and CDs. Although the perpetrator was eventually arrested and jailed, the authorities did nothing to help the band recover their equipment or secure any kind of restitution. The arresting officer failed to appear in court and the case was dropped.

2007
Feeling It reached the #1 spot on XM Satellite Radio's X Country chart for January; “no small feat for a band without label funding or radio promotion.” The remainder of the year proved to be busy and exciting for the band, as they continued touring and recording.

Their newest release, Celebration Highway, was released on June 26, 2007 and is a live retrospective recorded and filmed at Nashville, Tennessee's historic Belcourt Theatre. The two-disc set features a live CD with recordings from the show as well as a full-length concert film/documentary on DVD. "I think it's the crowning achievement of what we've done," Johnson said. "We did all the production ourselves -- Nick worked on the video editing, and we carried hand-held cameras on the road. We orchestrated shots at Red Rocks (Colorado), some in Manhattan and others on the beach at Isle of Palms (South Carolina). We did the whole nine yards ourselves."

2008 - present
In a May 30, 2008 interview with The Daily Times (Maryville, Tennessee), Johnson said, "I was cleaning house—cleaning up the room where all of our band T-shirts had accumulated—and just listening to the things we'd produced over the years. I listened to a little bit of everything, and it was great, man. It sounds like a cliche, but it really is the music that keeps me going. I just love it so much. You can take any career and look at it and think that you're not as successful as you should be or that you're better than what you're doing, and even now, I wouldn't say we're satisfied—we're always pushing to sell more records and make more fans all the time. Johnson added, "We like to keep it simple, because I think you can go too far sometimes with trying to dress it up, moving high-hats around and things like that. I'm blessed -- I get to work with two guys who aren't afraid to try anything, two guys who are so multi-talented. We all just love what we do, and we're gonna keep doing it." The band is currently in the process of completing work on their new album, entitled "The Best Is Yet To Come", set for a December 2012 release.

Performance and Stylistic Features
Bonepony usually travels in a Ford van pulling a small trailer that is strategically packed with an impressive amount of cargo. At any given show, the band may arrive with three guitars, a Dobro, a banjo, a fiddle, a mandolin, a dulcimer, a full drum set, various auxiliary percussion instruments, boards and bass pedals. The band usually arrive a couple of hours prior to the concert. They set up their instruments and the merchandise table where they sell CDs and T-shirts - their main source of profit. During every show, Johnson will say over the microphone, “Bonepony is an independent band, so go buy a CD, or two, or three. You guys are our record label.” The words vary, but the message is always the same.

Like most musicians, the members of Bonepony put a great deal of thought into their image. As performers, it is necessary that they look the part. There is a fine line between the performer and the audience. In addition to the spatial division: the stage versus the seats or dance floor, the change of attire also marks the transition into the role of the performer. The band members will travel and set up their gear in comfortable clothes and then retire backstage to change into their stage clothes just before the show begins. The members of the band each have their own individual style. Johnson has the most casual look, which usually consists of a band T-shirt and jeans, while Nguyen often wears button up collared shirts in rich colors or subtle, textured, patterns. Wright tends to have the most unusual sense of style as he consciously chooses pieces that are reminiscent of the 1970s. A typical outfit for Wright is a straw hat, a vintage concert T-shirt, tight flared leg jeans and pink Converse sneakers. All three band members have longer than average hair which is a classic rock and roll look.

The band usually plays for 2–3 hours, depending on the circumstances of the show. They typically open a set with a tune that is designed to hook a crowd. These songs are usually upbeat, rousing tunes like “Feast of Life” or “Cowboy Song.” However, if the crowd is thin and appears to be uninterested, Bonepony will open with “20 More People,” which acts as an implicit message to the audience. The chorus ironically exclaims, “Over there, over there, maybe twenty more people want to hear my song.”

In a typical performance, Bonepony will intersperse new material with classic, crowd favorites. They will usually wait until about halfway through the show before they will play their well known hit, "Jubilee." They almost always play what Johnson refers to as “our only angry song,” "Sugar On the Pill," and they always end the show with a light hearted, free spirited piece about coming of age and an unforgettable skinny dipping experience called "Heathers Wetter."

Unlike other musicians, Bonepony welcomes requests. Most of the time, in other musical settings, requests are looked down upon and even considered disrespectful and rude, but the members of Bonepony seem to find it incredibly amusing. For them, it is an interesting challenge when someone in the audience yells out a surprising request like "War Pigs" by Black Sabbath. It is also a wonderful opportunity for them to demonstrate their versatility and virtuosity.

With Bonepony's constant touring schedule, it is important that they do not perform the same show twice. Variation is important, especially for a band that has been touring for as long as Bonepony. It is imperative that they can always provide something new for their audience, so that they continue to come back. Bonepony not only promotes variation by constantly changing their set list, but also by reworking classic songs. They can take a two-minute song and turn it into a ten-minute extended jam session. They often add in intricate solos or change the instrumentation.

A Bonepony show is highly participatory. The band expects the crowd to get up and dance and takes personal offense when an apathetic or shy crowd remains in their seats. Johnson was born to be a front man. Nguyen states in his commentary on the Celebration Highway documentary, “He [Johnson] has an incredible command of the stage.” He's outgoing, friendly and has a way with words. Throughout a show, Johnson encourages the crowd to get up on their feet, to put their hands in the air, to clap or sing. He simply wants the audience to let the music move them. He often excitedly instructs the crowd by saying things like, “Can I get an Amen,” “Put your hands up in the air” or “Ya’ll sitting in the back, come down front and dance with us.“

Johnson will follow these instructions with a catch phrase that pretty much sums up the Bonepony experience: “It‘ll make you feel good inside.” It appears on merchandise and is repeated countless times during a show by Johnson. The participatory nature of a Bonepony performance is an extension of a couple of the themes discussed earlier like the idea of putting in the same amount of energy that you expect to gain, as well as, the “carpe diem” way of life in which you seize every day, take every opportunity and do what makes you feel good inside. A wonderful example of this is how Johnson led into a song on the 2006 airing of KET's Jubilee: A Celebration of American Music with, “We’re going to sing a song for you about feeling good inside. About squeezing all the juice out of life.”

It is important for members of a band to work together. They are, after all, creating one end product. The members of Bonepony have incredible dynamics; you can tell that they are friends on and off the stage. They know each other well and thus, they know what the other person wants. Most of the time, the guys do not have to vocalize anything at all. At times, a smile or moment of eye contact is sufficient enough and other times, they simply know what to do, when, where and how to do it.

The key to Bonepony's productive relationship is mutual respect. Each member of the band highly respects the other both as a musician and as a human being. They realize that Bonepony music would be nothing without each other and the respective talent that they each have to offer. As Johnson said during his commentary during the Celebration Highway documentary, “There’s a niche that a Bonepony song has and Nick and Kenny bring that.”

Bonepony is not only unique in the type of music that they play, but also how they play it.
The music itself is a melodious hybrid of rock, folk, country, bluegrass and soul, driven home with foot-stomping, four-on-the-floor beats crowbarred into four-minute musical masterpieces that make it impossible to enjoy while standing still. As one writer scribed, "If Bonepony doesn’t make you move you’re made of lead!" The live show is more of the same with the band tearing through their unscripted set with unconscious abandon; each band member seemingly playing a different instrument on every song and using every limb available to do so.

Their instrumental versatility and virtuosity is something that can't be ignored. Each member of the band can play several different instruments, and will switch off repeatedly throughout a single show. Wright might play drums on one song and dulcimer on the next. For the song, “Mountainside,” Johnson will assume a position behind the drums and sing while he plays, throwing back to an older, less common tradition of the lead vocalist/drummer, like Levon Helm in the group, The Band. Nguyen is always surrounded by instruments. To his left is a home-made, PVC pipe, guitar rack that holds three acoustic guitars, an electric guitar, a Dobro and a banjo. Behind him is a mandolin and a fiddle and at his feet are the bass pedals. It is not unusual to see Nguyen play a phenomenal fiddle solo all the while playing the bass line with his sock feet. As Johnson testifies during his commentary on Jubilee: A Celebration of American Music, "Nick is something else. He played guitar when he first joined the band and I thought it was extraordinary that he played, he plays open tuned guitars. He plays open C, open D. They’re not tuned standard the way a guitar, if you went and bought a guitar from the music store its tuned in a standard tuning in 4ths primarily. He tunes it in 5ths. He also plays standard Dobro, banjo and then out of necessity, we had a player leave back in October, he decided to pick up the fiddle. And I was skeptical. Fiddles no, that’s not an easy instrument to play, you know. And within six months, he was playing the songs as good or better than I’ve heard them played before. And now he’s bought a cello, a viola, which he doesn’t bring on the road because we don’t have enough space for all of his instruments. But the bass pedals…he decided that we needed some bass and I was like well how are you going to do that? How are you going to play guitar and bass? He said I’m going to get some bass pedals. I’m going to try to learn them. And at first he just started off real slowly. Only doing what he could pull off. And it has progressed to where he just almost plays on every single song…he’s just a genius."

The "Stomp Shoe"
During the early days of the band, Bonepony did not have a drummer or a bassist. The absence of a rhythm section was supplemented by band members playing various percussion instruments including bells, tambourines and small drums. However, Johnson wished to achieve the same effect for which the old blues musicians had perfected and were known. Therefore, he began stomping the beat on either a wooden box or the floor to achieve the desired effect and sound. As the band began touring more and more, they noticed that the sound wouldn't carry well in all venue settings so out of necessity the design required improvement. A pick up was placed inside an old tennis shoe and one of the band's members would wear the shoe and stomp out the beat while they played. Hence, the "Stomp Shoe" was developed. Lately, however, the band has stopped using the stomp shoe and instead built a specially-designed board, appropriately called the "Stomp Board," that can be stepped on the same way. As Nguyen explains, "We have a microphone in that shoe that I plug into a compressor, some old early analog techno stuff basically, analog drum machine stuff. And Scott’s got the same concept in an actual board, it does basically the same thing, and I can walk around and stand up and kind of feel a little bit better, and sometimes Scott’ll tip over and that’s the rhythm, that’s where that comes from." Kenny now is in charge of the "stomping", as Nguyen often needs both feet to operate the bass pedals.

Touring
Bonepony tours year-round and performs as many as 200 shows per year throughout the United States and Canada and has developed a large and devoted following. "That's the best part of being on the road. We've made friends in every small town and major metropolis around", rhapsodies Nguyen. Although the band's primary performance venues are bars, they also play in clubs, theatres, concert halls, and roadside honky-tonks. They also seem to have an uncanny ability to remember fans, sometime by name, who only attend a show every 2 or 3 years. During the summer months, Bonepony frequently plays outdoor gigs including countless open-air festivals like Farm Aid; Telluride Bluegrass Festival in Telluride, Colorado; and the Master Musicians Festival in Somerset, Kentucky. Bonepony has toured with such headline acts as Bob Seger, Santana, and ZZ Top, to name just a few. In fact, Bonepony has been referred to as "the hardest working band on the road," as they have performed over 2000 shows since 1999.

Bonepony has established several stock venues at which, year after year, the band repeatedly returns to play. Some of these reliable venues include 3rd and Lindsley Bar & Grill and Exit Inn which are both located in Nashville, Tennessee; The Spur in Park City, UT; Brick Alley in Frankfort, Kentucky; Executive Inn Rivermont in Owensboro, Kentucky; and The Windjammer in Isle of Palms, South Carolina. These certain locales prove more conducive to the “Bonepony experience” for several reasons. Firstly, the band's largest fan base is located in the Eastern United States and, more specifically, Tennessee, Kentucky, North Carolina, and Indiana. Therefore, Bonepony's most frequently played venues are located in those states. Secondly, there is the factor of geography. Traditionally, cities like Nashville, Louisville, and Asheville, as well as Knoxville, Tennessee and Bloomington, Indiana, are primary hubs for music within the region. However, in addition to these respected music scenes, Bonepony also plays the smaller towns just outside these larger cities. The Brewing Company, for example, is located in Bowling Green, Kentucky which is located between two major cities: Louisville and Nashville. Finally, there is the factor of convenience. Bowling Green is located just over one hour's drive from the band's current base in Nashville. Thus, it's just a short trip for the band to play a gig in that city which almost always results in a good crowd turnout. The band tours both east and west coast and has a venue in almost every state in the U.S.

Diehards
A huge part of Bonepony's appeal is the connection the band makes with its large base of fans and the sense of community that Bonepony promotes amongst them. "Diehards," as they have affectionately dubbed themselves, are those fans who are willing to travel great lengths and pay any sum of money to see the band perform. Many Diehards attend anywhere from 10 to 30 or more shows per year, depending upon their own personal circumstances; they dance their hearts out and sing along to every song; they seemingly know all of the ins-and-outs of a Bonepony performance; and they can usually predict what song is going to be played next, simply based upon the instruments that are picked up or Johnson's lead into a tune. Many Diehards hang out with the band after the show and tend to be on a first-name basis with its members. The Bonepony Diehard Fan Forum has played an instrumental role in unifying Diehards nationwide and beyond.

The appropriately-named "Diehard" event is a yearly series of shows aimed at gathering the most loyal Bonepony followers from all over the world together for a unique musical and social experience. It also gives the band the chance to spend some quality time with everyone and also to recruit new folks into the fold.
 Diehard #1 - October 9–10, 1999 @ 3rd and Lindsey (Nashville, Tennessee) and Douglas Corner (Nashville, Tennessee)
 Diehard #2 - January 29–30, 2000 @ 3rd and Lindsey (Nashville Tennessee) (2 shows)
 Diehard #3 - October 20–21, 2000 @ Duck Inn (Evansville, IN) and Exit/In (Nashville, Tennessee)
 Diehard #4 - October 2001 in Bowling Green, Kentucky; Lexington, Kentucky; and Louisville, Kentucky (4 shows)
 Diehard #5 - September 2002 @ 3rd Annual CANCER SUX Benefit Show (Kittanning, Pennsylvania)
 Diehard #6 - July-Aug 2004 in Virginia and North Carolina
 Diehard #7 - May 26–28, 2006 @ "Friday After Five" (Owensboro, Kentucky), Exit/In (Nashville, Tennessee), and the White Squirrel Festival (Brevard, North Carolina)
 Diehard #8 - March 1–3, 2007 @ The Boiler Room (Owensboro, Kentucky), The Belcourt Theater (Nashville, Tennessee), and The Brewing Co. (Bowling Green, Kentucky)
 Diehard #9 - September 18–20, 2008 @ The Windjammer (Isle of Palms, South Carolina) (3 shows)
 Diehard #10 - October 2–3, 2009 @ The Windjammer (Isle of Palms, South Carolina) (3 shows)
 Diehard #11 - September 23–25, 2010 @ The Windjammer (Isle of Palms, South Carolina) (3 shows)
 Diehard #12 - September 29–October 1, 2011 @ Peachtree Tavern (Atlanta, Georgia) (1 show), and The Windjammer (Isle of Palms, South Carolina) (2 shows)
 Diehard #13 - Cancelled - No "official" Diehard held in 2012 or any year thereafter

Discography

Studio albums

Live albums

Box sets

Band members

Current
 Scott Johnson - vocals, guitar, harmonica, percussion, bass pedals, drums
 Nicolas "Nick" Nguyen - guitar, banjo, mandolin, Dobro, violin, viola, bass pedals, keyboards, vocals
 Kenny Wright - drums & percussion, guitar, mandolin, mandola, dulcimer, stomp board, vocals

Past
 Bryan Ward - acoustic guitar
 Kenny Mims - Dobro, dulcimer, mandolin, mandola
 Jason Dunaway - bass guitar
 Mickey Grimm - drums, percussion
 Mike "Tramp" Lawing - fiddle, banjo, mandolin

Bios

Current band members
The following biographical information for each of the three current band members was sourced from the Official Bonepony Website.

Scott Johnson was born Jerry Scott Johnson on October 28 in Mt. Pleasant, Texas. He began singing when he was a small boy in church with his grandmother and later sang in school with the choir. As a teenager, his favorite bands were The Beatles, Led Zeppelin, Black Sabbath, Pink Floyd, as well as, Merle Haggard and George Jones. Johnson began songwriting when he was age 14 and joined his first band in the area after graduating at the age of 18. Frustrated with the limitations of a small town, he moved with some friends to Baltimore, Maryland when he was age 20 and then to Nashville, Tennessee at age 24. Johnson spent two years writing songs with Kenny Mims and Bryan Ward - songs that would become Bonepony's debut album, "Stomp Revival." Scott currently resides in Nashville, with his wife and three children.

Nicolas "Nick" Nguyen was born in Montreal, Quebec, Canada to a French-Canadian mother and Vietnamese father. Nicolas explored music early in his bohemian formative years. Relocating to the United States with his family in the mid-1980s, he earned a reputation as a young guitar phenom through constant gigging with local rock bands and high-profile guitar solo contests. In addition to guitar, Nicolas is fluent on violin, mandolin, banjo and piano. Nguyen graduated from Middle Tennessee State University. He credits his musical influences as The Beatles, Van Halen and violinist and composer Nicolo Paganini. Nguyen currently resides in Nashville, Tennessee with his wife and two sons.

Kenny Wright was born in a small-town in Alabama, but moved with his family to Nashville, Tennessee at the age of six months, where he still resides with his wife and daughter. His father and grandparents were all musicians and he was exposed at an early age to the music of Waylon Jennings, Gordon Lightfoot and Merle Haggard. He began playing guitar as a boy and discovered the music of KISS, which inspired him to form his own bands. As a mainstay on the Nashville, Tennessee rock scene he formed and recorded with his bands Scarlet, Prodigal Suns and Social Kings. He has toured with Hotter Than Hell, Tequila Sunrise and Max Vague and plays live and sessions in and around the Nashville area. Kenny's other musical favorites include Led Zeppelin, The Beatles, Queen, Free, Rolling Stones, Nick Drake, and The Eagles. In August 2008 he released his first solo album, Family Album and performs with his band The Great Affairs. He is currently producing the upcoming release for artist Joshua Ketchmark.

References

External links
 Official Bonepony Website

 Tramp website

Rock music groups from Maryland
Capitol Records artists